Tsholotsho High School is a co-educational, secondary school that is located in Tsholotsho 113 km south west of Zimbabwe's second largest city, Bulawayo. It was established in 1977 as Tsholotsho Secondary School.

References

External links 

Schools in Zimbabwe
Education in Matabeleland North Province
Educational institutions established in 1977
1977 establishments in Rhodesia